Lee Jae-bok (born June 27, 1961) is a South Korean athlete. He competed in the men's pole vault at the 1988 Summer Olympics.

References

1961 births
Living people
Athletes (track and field) at the 1988 Summer Olympics
South Korean male pole vaulters
Olympic athletes of South Korea
Place of birth missing (living people)
Asian Games medalists in athletics (track and field)
Asian Games bronze medalists for South Korea
Athletes (track and field) at the 1986 Asian Games
Medalists at the 1986 Asian Games
20th-century South Korean people